Lagado is a fictional city from the 1726 satirical novel Gulliver's Travels by Jonathan Swift.

Location
Lagado is the capital of the nation Balnibarbi, which is ruled by a tyrannical king from a flying island called Laputa. Lagado is on the ground below Laputa, and also has access to Laputa at any given time to proceed in an attack or defense.
It is located in the centre of the kingdom, some 150 miles from that land's Pacific coast.

Description

Lagado is poverty stricken like the rest of the nation. The king had invested a great fortune on building an Academy of Projectors in Lagado so that it shall contribute to the nation's development through research, but so far the Academy has yielded no result. The author has vividly described bizarre and seemingly pointless experiments conducted there, for example - trying to change human excretion back into food and trying to extract sunbeams out of cucumbers or teaching mathematics to pupils by writing propositions on wafers and consuming them with "cephalick tincture". Gulliver is clearly unimpressed with this academy and offers many suggestions to improve it. The author's ulterior motive on describing this place could possibly have been to point out the senseless side of science in his time.
The Academy is home to The Engine, a fictitious device resembling a modern computer. 

Gulliver's guide on Balnibarbi, Lord Munodi, a former governor of Lagado, is a rare case of a practical-minded man in the kingdom who runs his estate well and productively, but is seen as an oddity by other Laputans because he has no ear for music and must endure social ostracism.

Legacy

On Mars's largest moon, Phobos, there is a planitia, Lagado Planitia, which is named after Swift's Lagado because of his 'prediction' of the two then undiscovered Martian moons, which his Laputan astronomers had discovered.

Notes

References
Jonathan Swift: Guliver's Travels Oxford World Classics (1986, reprint 2008) introduction by Claude Rawson, explanatory notes by Ian Higgins. First published 1726.

See also 
Laputa
Lindalino
Gulliver's Travels

Fictional elements introduced in 1726
Fictional populated places
Gulliver's Travels locations